Carsten Bunk (born 29 February 1960) is a German rower who competed for East Germany in the 1980 Summer Olympics.

He was born in Berlin.

In 1980 he was a crew member of the East German boat which won the gold medal in the quadruple sculls event.

External links
 

1960 births
Living people
People from East Berlin
Rowers from Berlin
East German male rowers
Olympic rowers of East Germany
Rowers at the 1980 Summer Olympics
Olympic gold medalists for East Germany
Olympic medalists in rowing
Medalists at the 1980 Summer Olympics
Recipients of the Patriotic Order of Merit in silver